Pantelis Papaterpos (born 18 March 1968) is a Greek rower. He competed in the men's double sculls event at the 1988 Summer Olympics.

References

1968 births
Living people
Greek male rowers
Olympic rowers of Greece
Rowers at the 1988 Summer Olympics
Place of birth missing (living people)